Willy Korn (born January 21, 1989) is an American football coach and former quarterback who is currently the co-offensive coordinator and quarterbacks coach at Liberty University.

Playing career 
Ranked one of the top quarterback prospects of 2007, Korn committed to play college football at Clemson before his junior year at James F. Byrnes High School. After seeing some playing time in the garbage time of games his freshman year, he suffered injuries in back to back games, earning a medical redshirt for the season. He received his first start as a redshirt freshman in 2008 in Dabo Swinney's first game as interim head coach against Georgia Tech, but suffered a shoulder injury 14 plays into the game. Unable to win the starting quarterback job from Kyle Parker after his injury, Korn transferred to Marshall after the 2009 season. He spent very little time at Marshall after the coaching staff told him his throwing arm wasn't strong enough and asked him to convert to safety, transferring once again to Division II North Greenville to play quarterback.

Coaching career 
Korn was named the wide receivers coach at Charleston Southern in 2013, joining the staff of his former college coach at North Greenville, Jamey Chadwell. 

Korn followed Chadwell once again, this time at Coastal Carolina as the wide receivers coach while also handling kickoff coverage duties in 2017. He was promoted to co-offensive coordinator and reassigned to quarterbacks coach in 2019 following the promotion of Chadwell to head coach.

Korn was named the co-offensive coordinator and quarterbacks coach at Liberty under Chadwell on Dec. 30, 2022.

References

External links 
 
 Coastal Carolina bio

1989 births
Living people
People from Lyman, South Carolina
Players of American football from South Carolina
American football quarterbacks
Clemson Tigers football players
Clemson University alumni
North Greenville Crusaders football players
Charleston Southern Buccaneers football coaches
Coastal Carolina Chanticleers football coaches
Liberty Flames football coaches